Sheshunoff Consulting + Solutions (SCS) is a company that provides consulting and advisory services to the financial services industry. It was founded in 1971 as Sheshunoff Information Services, was later sold away from and then back to Sheshunoff Management Services, and then re-named Sheshunoff Consulting + Solutions. The company is headquartered in Austin, Texas. SCS focuses on management consulting, risk management, technology solutions, and investment banking.

Company history

Sheshunoff Information Services
Gabrielle and Alex Sheshunoff started Sheshunoff Information Services (SIS), in 1971, as a data business, consisting of State Books of ratios, rankings and bank data reports. SIS developed data reports, surveys and analysis, which were built into books. The company also offered seminars for bankers, focused on understanding the bank data. The seminars were expanded into an affiliation program to allow bankers to interact in small groups. The program for CEOs was first offered in 1982; for Senior Lenders in 1988; and for Technology and Operations in 1994.

In 1988, the Sheshunoffs sold the professional publishing branch of SIS to International Thomson, a Toronto-based company. In 1995, SIS acquired A. S. Pratt & Sons of Arlington, Virginia, a financial services publisher, and in 1997, SIS acquired 38 publications from Warren, Gorham & Lamont, a Thomson imprint.

In 2004, SIS was sold to Sheshunoff Management Services (see below).

Sheshunoff Management Services
In the late 1980s, the Sheshunoffs developed an investment banking group, and when SIS was sold to Thomson International, they retained the consulting and investment banking businesses and, in 1992, founded Sheshunoff Management Services. In the mid-90s, Sheshunoff Management Services became more focused on technology services and products, and risk management services. By 2001, they had developed a proprietary overdraft tool, Deposit Score.

In 2000, Gabrielle Sheshunoff and the private equity firm Austin Ventures launched Alex Information and, in 2004, Alex Information purchased SIS, retaining SIS as the name for the combined company. In 2005, Gabrielle Sheshunoff sold SIS to Thompson Publishing Group, a Washington, D.C. based professional publisher that is unrelated to International Thomson.

In the 2000s, Sheshunoff Management Services expanded by acquiring a number of companies including Harcourt Group, a Boston-based provider of risk management services, Servique, a Houston-based risk and compliance management services firm, Bennington Partners, a provider of loan review services, and Brintech, a bank management consulting firm with offices in Austin and Atlanta.

References

Financial services companies of the United States